Scopula tenera is a moth of the  family Geometridae. It is found in Uganda.

References

Endemic fauna of Uganda
Moths described in 1899
tenera
Insects of Uganda
Moths of Africa